Goncharovka is a rural locality (a selo) and the administrative center of Goncharovskoye Rural Settlement, Podgorensky District, Voronezh Oblast, Russia. The population was 907 as of 2010. There are 9 streets.

Geography 
Goncharovka is located on the Gnilaya Rossosh River, 24 km northwest of Podgorensky (the district's administrative centre) by road. Perevalnoye is the nearest rural locality.

References 

Rural localities in Podgorensky District